Edmund Victor Bobrowicz (May 1, 1919March 16, 2003) was an American trade union activist and politician from the state of Wisconsin.

Biography

Bobrowicz was born in Milwaukee, Wisconsin, the son of Polish immigrants. He served in the Army during the Second World War, in the South Pacific. In 1946, Bobrowicz (then working as a union organizer) ran successfully for the Democratic nomination for Wisconsin's 4th congressional district, ousting incumbent Representative Thaddeus Wasielewski, who was accused of voting for anti-labor legislation).

Before the general election, however, Bobrowicz was accused by the Milwaukee Journal of secretly being a Communist and was subsequently expelled from the Democratic Party. Wasielewski, hoping to regain his seat, re-entered the race as an independent, but the two split the Democratic vote, allowing Republican John C. Brophy to win, with 49,144 votes to Bobrowicz' 44,398, Wasielewski's 38.502, and Socialist George Helberg's 2,470.

Bobrowicz subsequently left politics and became a union official, working for 35 years as a representative of the International Fur & Leather Workers Union and the Amalgamated Meat Cutters until his retirement in 1977. In 1987, he and his wife moved to Green Bay to be closer to family.  He died at his home in Green Bay in 2003.

Electoral history

| colspan="6" style="text-align:center;background-color: #e9e9e9;"| Democratic Primary, August 13, 1946

| colspan="6" style="text-align:center;background-color: #e9e9e9;"| General Election, November 5, 1946

| colspan="6" style="text-align:center;background-color: #e9e9e9;"| General Election, November 2, 1948

References

1919 births
2003 deaths
American trade union leaders
American people of Polish descent
Military personnel from Wisconsin
Anti-communism in the United States
Politicians from Milwaukee
Wisconsin Democrats
United States Army personnel of World War II